Henry M. Brinckerhoff (1868–1949) was a pioneering highway engineer who in 1906 partnered with William Barclay Parsons to found what would eventually be known as Parsons Brinckerhoff, one of the largest transportation, planning and engineering companies in the United States. Brinckerhoff specialized in electric railways and he is best known for his co-invention of the third rail, which revolutionized rapid transit. He subsequently played a key role in the planning and development of transit systems of Chicago, Detroit, Cleveland and Cincinnati. Brinckerhoff also designed the network of roads at the 1939 New York World's Fair.

References

American engineers
1868 births
1949 deaths